Mi Fantasía (English: My Fantasy) is the eighth studio album recorded by Mexican band Los Bukis. It was released by Melody in 1983 (see 1983 in music).

Track listing

All songs written and composed by Marco Antonio Solís except for "Si No Es Contigo".

References

External links
 Mi Fantasia on amazon.com
[] Mi Fantasia on allmusic.com

1983 albums
Los Bukis albums
Fonovisa Records albums